22q13 deletion syndrome, also known as Phelan–McDermid syndrome (PMS), is a genetic disorder caused by deletions or rearrangements on the q terminal end (long arm) of chromosome 22. Any abnormal genetic variation in the q13 region that presents with significant manifestations (phenotype) typical of a terminal deletion may be diagnosed as 22q13 deletion syndrome. There is disagreement among researchers as to the exact definition of 22q13 deletion syndrome. The Developmental Synaptopathies Consortium defines PMS as being caused by SHANK3 mutations, a definition that appears to exclude terminal deletions. The requirement to include SHANK3 in the definition is supported by many but not by those who first described 22q13 deletion syndrome.

Prototypical terminal deletion of 22q13 can be uncovered by karyotype analysis, but many terminal and interstitial deletions are too small. The availability of DNA microarray technology for revealing multiple genetic problems simultaneously has been the diagnostic tool of choice. The falling cost for the whole exome sequencing and, eventually, whole genome sequencing, may replace DNA microarray technology for candidate evaluation. However, fluorescence in situ hybridization (FISH) tests remain valuable for diagnosing cases of mosaicism (mosaic genetics) and chromosomal rearrangements (e.g., ring chromosome, unbalanced chromosomal translocation). Although early researchers sought a monogenic (single gene genetic disorder) explanation, recent studies have not supported that hypothesis (see Etiology).

Signs and symptoms 

Affected individuals present with a broad array of medical and behavioral manifestations (tables 1 and 2). Patients are consistently characterized by global developmental delay, intellectual disability, speech abnormalities, ASD-like behaviors, hypotonia and mild dysmorphic features. Table 1 summarizes the dysmorphic and medical conditions that have been reported in individuals with PMS. Table 2 summarizes the psychiatric and neurological symptoms associated with PMS. Most of the studies include small samples or relied on parental report or medical record review to collect information, which can account in part for the variability in the presentation of some of the presenting features. Larger prospective studies are needed to further characterize the phenotype.

Cause

Various deletions affect the terminal region of the long arm of chromosome 22 (the paternal chromosome in 75% of cases ), from 22q13.3 to 22qter. Although the deletion is most typically a result of a de novo mutation, there is an inherited form resulting from familial chromosomal translocations involving the 22 chromosome. In the de novo form, the size of the terminal deletion is variable and can go from 130 Kb (130,000 base pairs) to 9 Mb. Deletions smaller than 1 Mb are very rare (about 3%). The remaining 97% of terminal deletions impact about 30 to 190 genes (see list, below). At one time it was thought that deletion size was not related to the core clinical features. That observation lead to an emphasis on the SHANK3 gene, which resides close to the terminal end of chromosome 22. Interest in SHANK3 grew as it became associated with autism spectrum disorder (ASD) and Schizophrenia. Since then, twelve other genes on 22q13 (MAPK8IP2, CHKB, SCO2, SBF1, PLXNB2, MAPK12, PANX2, BRD1, CELSR1, WNT7B, TCF20) have been associated with autism spectrum disorder and/or Schizophrenia (see references below). Some mutations of SHANK3 mimic 22q13 deletion syndrome, but SHANK3 mutations and microdeletions have quite variable impact.

Some of the core features of 22q13 deletion syndrome are dependent upon deletion size, and do not depend on the loss of SHANK3. As noted above, the distal 1 Mb of 22q is a gene rich region. There are too few clinical cases to statistically measure the relationship between deletion size and phenotype in this region. SHANK3 is also adjacent to a gene cluster (ARSA and MAPK8IP2) that has a high probability of contributing to ASD, suggesting the effects of SHANK3 deletion may be indistinguishable from other genetic losses. A landmark study of induced pluripotent stem cell neurons cultured from patients with 22q13 deletion syndrome shows that restoration of the SHANK3 protein produces a significant, but incomplete rescue of membrane receptors, supporting both a substantial role for SHANK3 and an additional role for other genes in the distal 1 Mb of chromosome 22.

There is an interest in the impact of MAPK8IP2 (also called IB2) in 22q13 deletion syndrome. MAPK8IP2 is especially interesting because it regulates the balance between NMDA receptors and AMPA receptors. The genes SULT4A1 and PARVB may cause 22q13 deletion syndrome in cases of more proximal interstitial and large terminal deletions. There are about 187 protein coding genes in the 22q13 region. A group of genes (MPPED1, CYB5R3, FBLN1, NUP50, C22ORF9, KIAA1644, PARVB, TRMU, WNT7B and ATXN10), as well as microRNAs may all contribute to loss of language, a feature that varies notably with deletion size. The same study found that macrocephaly seen in 22q13 deletion syndrome patients may be associated with WNT7B. FBLN1 is responsible for synpolydactyly as well as its contribution to the neurological manifestations (OMIM 608180).

Table of protein coding genes involved in 22q13 deletion syndrome (based on Human Genome Browser – hg38 assembly ). Underline identifies 13 genes that are associated with autism. Bold identifies genes associated with hypotonia (based on Human Phenotype Browser  search for 'hypotonia' and the OMIM database ).

Diagnosis and management

Clinical genetics and genetic testing

Genetic testing is necessary to confirm the diagnosis of PMS. A prototypical terminal deletion of 22q13 can be uncovered by karyotype analysis, but many terminal and interstitial deletions are too small to detect with this method. Chromosomal microarray should be ordered in children with suspected developmental delays or ASD. Most cases will be identified by microarray; however, small variations in genes might be missed. The falling cost for whole exome sequencing may replace DNA microarray technology for candidate gene evaluation. Biological parents should be tested with fluorescence in situ hybridization (FISH) to rule out balanced translocations or inversions. Balanced translocation in a parent increases the risk for recurrence and heritability within families (figure 3).

Clinical genetic evaluations and dysmorphology exams should be done to evaluate growth, pubertal development, dysmorphic features (table 1) and screen for organ defects (table 2)

Cognitive and behavioral assessment

All patients should undergo comprehensive developmental, cognitive and behavioral assessments by clinicians with experience in developmental disorders. Cognitive evaluation should be tailored for individuals with significant language and developmental delays. All patients should be referred for specialized speech/language, occupational and physical therapy evaluations.

Neurological management

Individuals with PMS should be followed by a pediatric neurologist regularly to monitor motor development, coordination, and gait, as well as conditions that might be associated with hypotonia. Head circumference should be performed routinely up until 36 months. Given the high rate of seizure disorders (up to 41% of patients) reported in the literature in patients with PMS and its overall negative impact on development, an overnight video EEG should be considered early to rule out seizure activity. In addition, a baseline structural brain MRI should be considered to rule out the presence of structural abnormalities.

Nephrology

All patients should have a baseline renal and bladder ultrasonography and a voiding cystourethrogram should be considered to rule out structural and functional abnormalities. Renal abnormalities are reported in up to 38% of patients with PMS. Vesicouretral reflux, hydronephrosis, renal agenesis, dysplastic kidney, polycystic kidney and recurrent urinary tract infections have all been reported in patients with PMS.

Cardiology

Congenital heart defects (CHD) are reported in samples of children with PMS with varying frequency (up to 25%)(29,36). The most common CHD include tricuspid valve regurgitation, atrial septal defects and patent ductus arteriosus. Cardiac evaluation, including echocardiography and electrocardiogram, should be considered.

Gastroenterology

Gastrointestinal symptoms are common in individuals with PMS. Gastroesophageal reflux, constipation, diarrhea and cyclic vomiting are frequently described.

Table 3: Clinical Assessment Recommendations in Phelan McDermid Syndrome

Epidemiology 

The true prevalence of PMS has not been determined. More than 1,200 people have been identified worldwide according to the Phelan–McDermid Syndrome Foundation. However, it is believed to be underdiagnosed due to inadequate genetic testing and lack of specific clinical features. It is known to occur with equal frequency in males and females. Studies using chromosomal microarray for diagnosis indicate that at least 0.5% of cases of ASD can be explained by mutations or deletions in the SHANK3 gene. In addition, when ASD is associated with ID, SHANK3 mutations or deletions have been found in up to 2% of individuals.

History 

The first case of PMS was described in 1985 by Watt et al., who described a 14-year-old boy with severe intellectual disability, mild dysmorphic features and absent speech, which was associated with terminal loss of the distal arm of chromosome 22. In 1988, Phelan et al. described a similar clinical presentation associated with a de novo deletion in 22q13.3. Subsequent cases were described in the following years with a similar clinical presentation. Phelan et al. (2001), compared 37 subjects with 22q13 deletions with features of 24 cases described in the literature finding that the most common features were global developmental delay, absent or delayed speech and hypotonia. In 2001, Bonaglia et al., described a case that associated the 22q.13 deletion syndrome with a disruption of the SHANK3 gene (also called ProSAP2). The following year, Anderlid et al. (2002), refined the area in 22q13 presumably responsible for the common phenotypic presentation of the syndrome to a 100kb in 22q13.3. Out of the three genes affected, SHANK3 was identified as the critical gene due to its expression pattern and function. Wilson et al. (2003) evaluated 56 patients with the clinical presentation of PMS, all of whom had a functional loss of one copy of the SHANK3 gene. However, later the same group demonstrated that loss of SHANK3 gene was not an essential requirement for the disorder.

Notes

References
 
 
 
 22q13.org "22q13 deletion syndrome home"

External links 

 

Autosomal monosomies and deletions
Genetic anomalies
Chromosomal abnormalities
Neurodevelopmental disorders